Remix & Repent is the second EP by American rock band Marilyn Manson. It was released on November 25, 1997 during their Antichrist Superstar period. It features remixes of songs from Antichrist Superstar, live tracks recorded during the Dead to the World tour, and an acoustic version of "Man That You Fear".

Critical reception

Johnny Walker, in reviewing for MTV, summarized his review of the EP and the band's career thus far, "Those who would like to comfort themselves with the notion that Marilyn Manson is just a temporary aberration, an unpleasant interlude in their lives of waking sleep, overlook the fact that beyond all the outrage, this band is packing some musical dynamite."

Track listing

Charts

References

Marilyn Manson (band) albums
1997 EPs
1997 remix albums
Remix EPs
Interscope Records remix albums
Interscope Records EPs